In Greek mythology, Ochimus (Ancient Greek: Ὄχιμος) was the eldest of the Heliadae, sons of Helios and Rhodos.

Mythology 
One of his brothers, Tenages, was murdered by four others: Actis, Macareus, Candalus and Triopas, and they had to leave their native island of Rhodes. The final two Heliadae, Ochimus and Cercaphus, were the only to stay, as they had not been involved in the crime.

Ochimus seized control over the island. He married Hegetoria and they had a daughter, Cydippe (or Cyrbia), who married Ochimus' brother, Cercaphus, who succeeded to the throne of Rhodes. According to an alternate version, Ochimus engaged Cydippe to Ocridion but Cercaphus loved her and kidnapped her. He did not return until Ochimus was old. The three sons of Cercaphus and Cydippe inherited the island.

Notes

References 

 Diodorus Siculus, The Library of History translated by Charles Henry Oldfather. Twelve volumes. Loeb Classical Library. Cambridge, Massachusetts: Harvard University Press; London: William Heinemann, Ltd. 1989. Vol. 3. Books 4.59–8. Online version at Bill Thayer's Web Site
 Diodorus Siculus, Bibliotheca Historica. Vol 1-2. Immanel Bekker. Ludwig Dindorf. Friedrich Vogel. in aedibus B. G. Teubneri. Leipzig. 1888-1890. Greek text available at the Perseus Digital Library.
 Lucius Mestrius Plutarchus, Moralia with an English Translation by Frank Cole Babbitt. Cambridge, MA. Harvard University Press. London. William Heinemann Ltd. 1936. Online version at the Perseus Digital Library. Greek text available from the same website.

Kings in Greek mythology
Children of Helios
Demigods in classical mythology